The Australian Water Polo League is the premier Australian domestic water polo competition. The men's league began in 1990 and the women's league started in 2004. Ten clubs compete in the league, each fielding a women's and a men's team. As of 2021 five clubs are based in Sydney and one each in Adelaide, Brisbane, Fremantle, Newcastle and Perth.

The first history of the sport in Australia was launched in February 2009, under the title 'Water Warriors: Chronicle of Australian Water Polo', by Dr. Tracy Rockwell. The 592-page publication features over 1,300 images and is an in-depth reference on water polo in Australia from its first match in 1879 to the 2008 Beijing Olympic Games. An updated edition is being planned.

Current teams
 Adelaide Jets
 UTS Balmain Tigers
 Cronulla Sharks
 Drummoyne Devils
 Fremantle Mariners (M)
 Fremantle Marlins (W)
 Hunter Hurricanes
 Sydney University Lions
 UNSW Killer Whales (W)
 UNSW Wests Magpies (M)
 UWA Torpedoes
 Queensland Thunder

Men's Champions

Women's Champions

Media coverage

See also

Water polo in Australia

References

External links

 
Aus
Water polo leagues in Oceania
Water polo
1990 establishments in Australia
Sports leagues established in 1990
Professional sports leagues in Australia